Chris Brody may refer to:

 Chris Brody (character), a character from the TV series Homeland
 Chris Brody, a character from the TV series Haven

See also
 Christopher Brady (disambiguation)